Teracotona pruinosa is a moth in the family Erebidae. It was described by Joseph de Joannis in 1912. It is found in Eritrea and Ethiopia.

References

Moths described in 1912
Spilosomina